Time Circle is a compilation album by Spirit, issued in 1991.

This set draws heavily from the four albums released by the original line-up on Ode Records and Epic Records. It also includes some outtakes and versions of songs from then unreleased soundtrack work (Model Shop ). At the time that this set was released, Twelve Dreams of Dr. Sardonicus was the only studio album by the original group still in print.

Several of the outtakes were later included on the 1996 reissues of the first four albums. The remixes of the tracks on The Family That Plays Together (necessitated because the master mix was lost shortly after the album's release) are different from the 1996 re-release.

Tracks listing

Disc One 

Tracks 1–9 from Spirit
Tracks 10–13, 15–17 from The Family That Plays Together
Track 14 is an outtake from The Family That Plays Together
Tracks 18–21 from sessions for the Model Shop soundtrack
Tracks 10–20 are new remixes

Disc Two 

Tracks 1–2 are outtakes from The Family That Plays Together
Tracks 3–8 from Clear
Tracks 9-10 are from single 45rpm only release, 1969
Tracks 11–19 from Twelve Dreams of Dr. Sardonicus
Track 20 from the Potato Land sessions

References 

Spirit (band) albums
1991 greatest hits albums
Albums produced by Lou Adler
Albums produced by David Briggs (producer)